Potato Head Kids is an American animated television series that aired in 1986. It was made to pair with My Little Pony 'n Friends. An episode of My Little Pony was played for 15 minutes, and then an episode of Potato Head Kids, MoonDreamers, or The Glo Friends was played. It appeared on CBN Family Channel from 1989 to 1990.

Premise
Potato Head Kids was an outgrowth of the Mr. Potato Head character franchise. Mr. Potato Head now played an adult figure in the lives of the title kids, a varied bunch of anthropomorphic potatoes with different personalities. The Potato Head Kids do a lot of things in their life while also clashing with a gang of potato-hating delinquents led by Grease.

Characters
 Mr. Potato Head (voiced by Kenneth Mars)
 Mrs. Potato Head (voiced by Linda Gary) 
 Big Chip (voiced by David Mendenhall) - The leader of the Potato Head Kids.
 Puff (voiced by Anne Marie McEvoy) - A bonnet-wearing potato.
 Spud (voiced by Breckin Meyer) - A cowboy hat-wearing potato that talks like a cowboy.
 Lumpy (voiced by Ian Fried) - A beanie hat-wearing potato.
 Lolly (voiced by Kellie Martin)
 Slick (voiced by Scott Grimes) 
 Spike (voiced by Scott Menville) 
 Smarty Pants (voiced by Susie Garbo) - A female potato in a green hair bow who is the smartest of the potatoes.'

Villains
 Grease's Gang - A group of delinquents who are the main antagonists of the series
 Grease - A kid who is the leader of his gang. He has a crush on Puff and tries to marry her in the Robin Hood episode.
 Auna - A female member of Grease's gang.
 Freezer - A large and strong member of Grease's gang.

Crew
 Ginny McSwain - Voice Director

Episodes

Reception
In 2014, io9 listed it among twelve 1980s cartoons that supposedly did not deserve remembrance, heavily criticizing the basis of the series.

References

External links
 
 

1980s American animated television series
1986 American television series debuts
1987 American television series endings
American children's animated adventure television series
American children's animated fantasy television series
Animated television series about children
Kids
Television shows based on Hasbro toys
The Family Channel (American TV network, founded 1990) original programming
Television series by Sunbow Entertainment
Television series by Marvel Productions
Television series by Claster Television